Baildon is the name of a civil parish, and also of a ward of the City of Bradford, West Yorkshire, England.  The parish and the ward together contain 91 listed buildings that are recorded in the National Heritage List for England.  Of these, three are listed at Grade II*, the middle of the three grades, and the others are at Grade II, the lowest grade.

In the parish are the town of Baildon and the surrounding area.  Most of the listed buildings in the town are houses, cottages and shops, and the other listed buildings include churches and associated structures, a set of stocks, a cross and cross base, a model farm, a school, milestones, and buildings formerly involved in the textile industry.  To the west of the town is Roberts Park, part of the model village of Saltaire, which contains a number of listed buildings.

The ward is to the east of the parish, and its main settlement is the village of Esholt.  The listed buildings in and around the village include cottages and houses, farmhouses and farm buildings, a church, a public house, a bridge, a memorial hall, and a telephone kiosk.  To the southeast is Esholt Hall, a large house, which is listed together with associated structures, and to the south is the listed Field Lock, a three-rise lock on the Leeds and Liverpool Canal.


Key

Buildings

References

Citations

Sources

 

Lists of listed buildings in West Yorkshire